Teddy Bear ("10 hours to paradise") is a 2012 Danish film starring Kim Kold as a Danish bodybuilder who travels to Thailand to find love. The film was directed by Mads Matthiesen and written by Matthiesen and Martin Zandvliet. Teddy Bear is based on Matthiesen's 2007 short film Dennis, which starred Kold in the same role.

Plot
Despite his physique, Dennis (Kim Kold), a thirty-eight-year-old Danish bodybuilder, has never had a girlfriend and lives with his elderly mother, Ingrid (Elsebeth Steentoft), in a small town outside Copenhagen.  On arriving home from a date gone south, Dennis undergoes his mother's interrogation on his whereabouts.  He fabricates a story about going to the movies which hints at a possessiveness on her part that makes it difficult for him to form relationships.  Things appear even more bleak when his uncle, Bent (Allan Mogensen), marries a younger woman from Thailand, making Dennis feel even more hopeless about his situation.

Believing that his nephew's chances for a relationship will improve outside the country, Bent arranges for Dennis to fly to Thailand.  He leaves, telling a disgruntled Ingrid that he is going to Germany to compete in a bodybuilding competition.  Though the culture shock is initially daunting, Dennis feels more comfortable after meeting Scott (David Winters), a middle-aged American man who introduced Bent to his wife.  Scott plays matchmaker by offering to arrange a blind date for Dennis, a prospect that bolsters his confidence.  That night, however, Dennis feels uneasy when it becomes apparent that the bar in which the meeting is to take place is frequented by older gentleman seeking pleasure from the women in Scott's employ (who turn out to be prostitutes).  Despite reservations, Dennis takes one of them back to his hotel room, but the cheapness and aseptic nature of the scenario make him hesitant and he rejects her advances.

The next morning, Dennis attends a local gym where Prap (Prap Poramabhuti) and Bobby (Bobby Murcer), two of the patrons, recognize him from his bodybuilding career.  While discussing his passion, Dennis's shyness and social ineptitude vanish and Prap introduces him to Toi (Lamaiporn Sangmanee Hougaard), a local woman who owns the gym.  Though having more in common with this crowd, Dennis goes back for a second round at the bar, but leaves within minutes of meeting another prostitute.  Following up on an invitation from Prap, he joins him and his friends for dinner where a conversation with Toi sparks an attraction.  A day of fun and sight-seeing builds up to an evening visit to Toi's apartment, where the two kiss passionately, but Dennis's shyness resurfaces and he abruptly leaves.  Realizing, however, that Toi is the only woman with whom he has ever felt a connection, he returns and, in a poignant scene, the two embrace and fall asleep in each other's arms without having sexual relations.

With plans for the future, Dennis goes back to Denmark.  Unable to lie anymore, he eventually divulges everything to Ingrid, who accuses him of being a sex tourist and forbids him from seeing Toi again.  He agrees, but then secretly arranges for Toi to come to Denmark permanently.   He avoids introducing Toi to Ingrid and tells her that the time he spends with his mother is due to her convalescing from a heart condition and not because he lives with her.  Ultimately, the charade falls apart when Dennis and Toi happen to cross paths with Ingrid at a shopping mall.  Intent on quelling Ingrid's anger, Dennis comes home and finds her sitting at the table with an injured hand.  He goes to his room, finds its contents destroyed, and cries silently.  In the aftermath, it is revealed that Ingrid's insecurities stem from Dennis's father having left her before he was born.  Her attempts to play the victim, however, fall short to Dennis's passive resolution to become independent.  He packs his belongings and kisses her goodbye.  The last scene shows him getting into the car with Toi and exchanging loving looks while driving to their new home.

Cast
 Kim Kold as Dennis
 Elsebeth Steentoft as Ingrid
 Lamaiporn Sangmanee Hougaard as Toi
 David Winters as Scott
 Allan Mogensen as Bent
 Sukunya Mongkol as Phat
 Barbara Zatler as Sasha
 Prap Poramabhuti as Prap
 Sukianya Suwan as Aoi
 John Winters as Jeff (as Jonathan Winters)
 Paweena Im-Erb as Nok
 Songporn Na Bangchang as Nuu
 Patrick Johnson as Lars

Production
Teddy Bear was Matthiesen's first feature-length film; it was inspired by his 2007 short film Dennis, which also starred Kold, and was also co-written with Zandvliet. Director Frank Corsaro, after seeing the short film, encouraged Matthiesen to turn it into a full-length film. Matthiesen decided to cast mostly non-actors in the film, in order to give the film as realistic a tone as possible. Kold himself had been a non-actor when Matthiesen cast him in Dennis, although since then he appeared in other films and television shows.

Reception

Critical reception
Rotten Tomatoes gives the film a score of 94%, with an average rating of 7.58/10, based on 16 reviews from critics. Manohla Dargis of The New York Times called Teddy Bear "a largely likable tale" and wrote, "Mr. Matthiesen has a way of consistently and gently upending expectations, sometimes with humor." David Fear of Time Out New York wrote, "It's only a slight exaggeration to say Kold gives what may be the performance of the year, one that not only offsets the movie's momentary dips into self-conscious quirkiness but adds a genuine sweetness to the proceedings."

Awards
Matthiesen won the directing award in the category "World Cinema - Dramatic" for Teddy Bear at the 2012 Sundance Film Festival. The film was also nominated for the Grand Jury Prize in the same category, at the Sundance Festival.

References

External links
 

2012 films
2012 drama films
Danish drama films
Features based on short films
Films set in Denmark
Films set in Pattaya
Films set in Thailand
Bodybuilding films